The flyweight was the second lightest freestyle wrestling weight class held as part of the Wrestling at the 1904 Summer Olympics programme.  It was the first time the event, like all other freestyle wrestling events, was held in Olympic competition.  Three wrestlers competed.

Results

References

Sources
 

Wrestling at the 1904 Summer Olympics